John Benjamin may refer to:

John F. Benjamin (1817–1877), U.S. Representative from Missouri
John F. Benjamin (Medal of Honor), American Civil War soldier and Medal of Honor recipient
John Oponjo Benjamin (born 1952), Sierra Leonean economist and politician
John Toshack (born 1949), full name John Benjamin Toshack, Welsh footballer and football manager, known as John Benjamin in Spain

See also
Jon Benjamin (disambiguation)